Nicholas Joel Sarwark (born August 27, 1979) is an American attorney and businessman who served as the 19th chair of the Libertarian National Committee (LNC), the governing body of the Libertarian Party. Prior to his election in 2014, he served on several LP national committees and as chair of the Libertarian Party of Maryland State Committee and vice chair of the Libertarian Party of Colorado State Committee. , he is the only LP chair to have served three consecutive terms.

Sarwark declined to run for another term as LNC chair in 2020, and was succeeded by Joe Bishop-Henchman.

Early life and education
Sarwark was born on August 27, 1979, in Phoenix, Arizona. He graduated from Washington Adventist University in 1998 with a BS in computer science and a minor in philosophy, later receiving his juris doctor from American University Washington College of Law in 2008. While attending law school, Sarwark clerked for the libertarian law firm Institute for Justice.

In the early 1990s, Sarwark's father brought him to Maricopa County Libertarian gatherings, and Sarwark subsequently joined the party in 1999.

Political career and campaigns
Sarwark was chairman of the Libertarian Party of Maryland from 2001 to 2003, holding numerous LP officer and local-level roles there. Prior to being elected chairman of the Libertarian National Committee in 2014, Sarwark served as a deputy public defender in Colorado and as vice-chairman of the Libertarian Party of Colorado. He was re-elected in 2016, and again in 2018.

While serving as LNC chair, Sarwark made appearances on multiple national media outlets, including MSNBC and NPR, to discuss libertarian perspectives on various topics.

Sarwark ran in the 2018 Phoenix mayoral special election. His campaign platform included opposition to light rail, addressing the city's pension debt, and working with Republicans and Democrats on the city council. He garnered 10.5 percent of the vote, placing fourth among four candidates, and did not advance to the 2019 run-off.

After moving to New Hampshire, Sarwark ran for Hillsborough County Attorney in 2020 under the Libertarian Party. His major issues included clearing the criminal case backlog. He received 5.6 percent of the vote, placing third among three candidates. Sarwark ran for the same office in 2022 under both the Libertarian and Democratic parties. He placed second in a two-candidate race with 45.25 percent of the vote.

Personal life
Sarwark married his wife, Valerie in 2009. After building a family in Denver, he returned to Phoenix in 2014 to join his family's independent car dealership, where he served as vice-president. Sarwark and his wife have four children. In 2019, Sarwark and his family moved to Manchester, New Hampshire, to become a part of the grassroots libertarian movement the Free State Project.

Electoral history

References

External links

 
  at the Libertarian Policy Institute, of which Sarwark is Executive Director
  at Wedge Squared Strategies, of which Sarwark is Principal
 
  (archived)
 
 
 

1979 births
Living people
American automobile salespeople
Arizona Libertarians
Candidates in the 2018 United States elections
Candidates in the 2020 United States elections
Colorado Libertarians
Lawyers from Phoenix, Arizona
Libertarian National Committee chairs
Maryland Libertarians
New Hampshire Libertarians
People from Denver
Politicians from Phoenix, Arizona
Public defenders
Washington College of Law alumni